The Fichtel Mountain Nature Park lies in the tri-border area of Saxony, the Czech Republic and Bavaria and has an area of . It is maintained by the Naturpark Fichtelgebirge e. V. in Wunsiedel.

Landscape 
The Fichtel Mountains, with their expanse of forests and pasture land, lie on the intersection between the Thuringian Forest, Franconian Forest, Upper Palatine Forest and Ore Mountains. The Fichtel is Germany's main watershed and is a source of the rivers Main, Saale, Eger and Naab. Its main towns are Wunsiedel and Marktredwitz.

Leisure 
Sporting pursuits in the area include walking, swimming, cycling and mountain biking, and, in winter skiing and ice-skating.

Nature park information points 
There are the following information points:
 Grassemann Open Air Museum (Freilandmuseum Grassemann)
 Forestry, special exhibitions, subject-specific events
 Grassemann 3, 95485 Warmensteinach
 Weißenstadt Information Shack (Infoscheune Weißenstadt)
 Water – source of life
 Bayreuther Straße, 95163 Weißenstadt
 Kleiner Johannes Mining Information Point (Bergwerksinformationsstelle "Kleiner Johannes")
 Mining and geology
 Altes Bergwerk 1, 95659 Arzberg
 Häuselloh Quarry (Schausteinbruch Häuselloh)
 Extraction and working of granite
 Europäische Natur- und Kulturlandschaft Häuselloh e. V, Hans Popp, Dürrloh 3 95100 Selb
 Zell Information Point (Informationsstelle Zell)
 The Fichtelgebirge cultural landscape - varied habitats
 Rathaus, Bahnhofstraße 10, 95239 Markt Zell im Fichtelgebirge

See also 
 List of nature parks in Germany

References 

 Franz X. Bogner: Das Fichtelgebirge im Luftbildportrait. Ellwanger Verlag 2008, .

External links 
 Fichtel Mountain Nature Park 

Fichtelgebirge
Fichtel Mountains